The Duchy of Estonia may refer to: 

Duchy of Estonia (1219–1346) – Hertugdømmet Estland, a Dominum directum of King of Denmark
Duchy of Estonia (1561–1721) – Hertigdömet Estland, a dominion of the Kingdom of Swedish Empire
Duchy of Estonia (1721–1917) or Governorate of Estonia – Эстляндская губерния, Estlyandskaya guberniya, a viceroyalty of the Russian Empire